Ka with macron (К̅) is a letter of the Cyrillic script. It was formerly used in the first alphabet for the Altai language.